Andik Rendika Rama (born 16 March 1993, in Gresik) is an Indonesian professional footballer who plays as a left-back for Liga 1 club Arema. Rendika judged to meet the criteria as a modern young defender.

Club career

Early career
When 16 years old, Andik already far apart the family, he joined to the Persebaya Surabaya U-21 in 2009–10 Indonesia Super League U-21. Shown impressive in Persebaya U-21, Andik moved to Deltras Sidoarjo U-21 in 2012 until 2014. and in 2015, Andik moved to Persela Lamongan and eventually joined to Persija Jakarta.

Persija Jakarta
He was signed for Persija Jakarta to play in Indonesia Soccer Championship A in 2016. Andik made his First debut with Persija Jakarta against Persipura Jayapura in the first week of the 2016 Indonesia Soccer Championship A.

Madura United
In 2017, Andik joined to Madura United family factors made it had to take this decision, because his grandma was sick. He made his league debut on 16 April 2017 in a match against Bali United at the Gelora Ratu Pamelingan Stadium, Pamekasan.

Arema
On 5 April 2022, Andik signed contract for Arema. He made his league debut on 11 September 2022 in a match against Persib Bandung at the Kanjuruhan Stadium, Malang.

Career statistics

Club

Honours

Club
Arema
Indonesia President's Cup: 2022

References

External links 
 
 Andik Rendika Rama at Liga Indonesia

1993 births
Living people
Indonesian footballers
People from Gresik Regency
Sportspeople from East Java
Deltras F.C. players
Persela Lamongan players
Persija Jakarta players
Madura United F.C. players
Arema F.C. players
Liga 1 (Indonesia) players
Association football defenders